Kal is a village in the Municipality of Semič in Slovenia. The area is part of the historical region of Lower Carniola. The municipality is now included in the Southeast Slovenia Statistical Region. 

The local church is dedicated to Saint Leonard and belongs to the Parish of Semič. It dates to the 18th century.

References

External links

Kal at Geopedia

Populated places in the Municipality of Semič